Umberto Carteni (born 3 August 1970) is an Italian film director and screenwriter.

Filmography

Film
Different from Whom? (2009)
Studio illegale (2013)
Divorzio a Las Vegas (2020)
Quasi orfano (2022)

Television series
L'isola di Pietro (2017)

References

External links
 

1970 births
Living people
Film people from Rome
Italian film directors
Italian screenwriters